The volleyball tournaments at the 2015 European Games in Baku were played between 13 and 28 June. 12 teams participated in the two indoor tournaments, while 32 pairs took part in each of the beach volleyball events.

Qualification

Indoor volleyball

Each event will accept twelve entered teams. Qualification for indoor volleyball for the 2015 European Games is based on European rankings. Those rankings shall be taken on 1 January 2015, and based on the CEV Entry Ranking/Euro league participations. As hosts, Azerbaijan shall be entitled to entry in both indoor events, and nations will be restricted to single team of 14 players in each event.

Beach volleyball

Each event will accept 32 entered teams. Qualification for beach volleyball will be based on the CEV Beach Volleyball Ranking on 1 January 2015. The top 30 teams in the rankings will be invited to enter, subject to a maximum entry of two teams per nation, while two team places will be reserved in each event for hosts Azerbaijan.

2016 Summer Olympics Qualification

FIVB has awarded Beach Volleyball the same ranking points as the continental tour masters which will be used for Rio 2016 Olympic Qualification purposes.

Timetable

First version of the competition schedule.

Medal summary

References

 
Sports at the 2015 European Games
2015
Volleyball competitions in Azerbaijan